Nicole Cherubini (born 1970, Boston, MA) is an American visual artist and sculptor. She lives and works in New York.

Work
Working largely in sculpture and mixed media, she has presented solo exhibitions at Samsøñ (Boston, MA), Perez Art Museum Miami (Miami, FL), the Santa Monica Museum of Art (Los Angeles, CA), the Institute of Contemporary Art (Philadelphia, PA), Tracy Williams (NY), the Nassau County Museum of Art (Roslyn Harbor, NY), the Jersey City Museum (Jersey City, NJ), and La Panadería (Mexico City, MX). Her works have been included in group exhibitions at institutions including MoMA PS1 (Long Island City, NY), the Cranbrook Art Museum (Bloomfield Hills, MI), The Tang Teaching Museum and Art Gallery (Saratoga, NY), the Museum of Fine Arts (Boston, MA), the Institute of Contemporary Art (Boston, MA), the Boston University Art Gallery (Boston, MA), the Boston Center for the Arts (Boston, MA), Permanenten: The West Norway Museum of Decorative Art (Bergen, NO), the Rhode Island School of Design Museum (Providence, RI), and the Sculpture Center (Long Island City, NY). Her work has received press from Art in America, Art Forum, Art News, BOMB Magazine, The New York Times, The New Yorker; also featured on The Pot Book by Edmund De Waal, and Breaking The Mold new approaches to ceramics by black god publishing. Her work is in the public collections at the Massachusetts Institute of Technology (Boston, MA), the Museum of Fine Arts (Boston, MA), the Institute of Contemporary Art (Boston, MA), the Perez Museum Miami (Miami, FL), The Tang Teaching Museum and Art Gallery (Saratoga, NY), the Progressive Collection (Mayfield Village, OH), and the Tishman Speyer Collection (NY).

Education
Cherubini graduated from the Rhode Island School of Design in 1993 with a Bachelor of Fine Arts in Ceramics. She continued her education at New York University Institute of Fine Arts, earning her Master of Fine Arts in Visual Arts in 1998. Cherubini attended the Skowhegan School of Painting and Sculpture in 2002.

Awards
Cherubini is a recipient of the NEA Travel Grant to Mexico (1994), a New England Foundation for the Arts Fellowship in Sculpture (1995), a Watershed Center for Ceramic Arts Residency Fellowship (1997), the Jack Goodman Award for Art and Technology at New York University (1998), the Greenwich House Pottery Artist Residency (Summer-Fall 2000), a Residency at Henry Street Settlement in New York, NY (2002), the Emerge Artist Development Program, Aljira Center for Contemporary Art, New Jersey, NJ (2002),  the Louis Comfort Tiffany Foundation Award (2007) and an Art Matters Foundation Grant for travel and work in Mexico (2008–09).

Representation
She is represented by SEPTEMBER Gallery in Hudson, NY and Tracy Williams, Ltd. in New York City.

References

Further reading

Sources

Curriculum vitae

 2014 Bomb Magazine interview of Nicole Cherubini by Sarah Braman
"Art in America" review by Faye Hirsch
"Artforum" Top Ten 
"Artnews" CLAYTIME! CERAMICS FINDS ITS PLACE IN THE ART-WORLD MAINSTREAM by Lilly Wei
"NY Times" Spray!: Polly Apfelbaum/Nicole Cherubini Studiowork by ROBERTA SMITH
"The New Yorker" DAVIS, CHERUBINI
"Big Red & Shiny" Review of golden specific at Samsøñ, Nicole Cherubini
"Daily Serving" Review of golden specific at Samsøñ, Nicole Cherubini
"artnet" GOTHAM ART & THEATER by Elisabeth Kley

1970 births
Living people
American potters
American women ceramists
American ceramists
Rhode Island School of Design alumni
New York University Institute of Fine Arts alumni
Women potters
21st-century American women artists
21st-century ceramists